The Magritte Award for Best Director (French: Magritte du meilleur réalisateur) is an award presented annually by the Académie André Delvaux. It is given in honor of a film director who has exhibited outstanding directing while working within the film industry. It is one of the Magritte Awards, which were established to recognize excellence in Belgian cinematic achievements.

The 1st Magritte Awards ceremony was held in 2011 with Jaco Van Dormael receiving the award for his work in Mr. Nobody. As of the 2022 ceremony, Laura Wandel is the most recent winner in this category for her work in Playground.

Winners and nominees
In the list below, winners are listed first in the colored row, followed by the other nominees.

2010s

2020s

References

External links
 Magritte Awards official website
 Magritte Award for Best Director at AlloCiné

2011 establishments in Belgium
Awards established in 2011
Awards for best director
Director